Mian Yawar Zaman is a Pakistani politician. He was a Member of the Punjab Assembly. He has continuously been winning the elections since 2002. He is the son of Mian Muhammad Zaman.

Early life and education
He was born on 21 March 1961 in a Well-Known Political Arain Family  in Okara.

He received his early education from Sadiq Public School. He graduated in 1980 from Government College in Okara and has the degree of Bachelor of Arts.

Political career

He was elected to the Provincial Assembly of the Punjab as a candidate of Pakistan Muslim League (N) (PML-N) from Constituency PP-191 (Okara-VII) in 2002 Pakistani general election. He received 28,355 votes and defeated a candidate of Pakistan Muslim League (Q).

He was re-elected to the Provincial Assembly of the Punjab as a candidate of PML-N from Constituency PP-191 (Okara-VII) in 2008 Pakistani general election. He received 16,975 votes and defeated an independent candidate.

He was re-elected to the Provincial Assembly of the Punjab as a candidate of PML-N from Constituency PP-191 (Okara-VII) in 2013 Pakistani general election. In June 2013, he was inducted into the provincial Punjab cabinet of Chief Minister Shehbaz Sharif and was made Provincial Minister of Punjab for Irrigation where he served until November 2016. In a cabinet reshuffle in November 2016, he was made Provincial Minister of Punjab for  forest, wildlife, and fisheries.

He was re-elected to Provincial Assembly of the Punjab as a candidate of PML-N from Constituency PP-188 (Okara-VI) in 2018 Pakistani general election.

References

Living people
1961 births
Punjab MPAs 2013–2018
Punjab MPAs 2008–2013
Punjab MPAs 2002–2007
Pakistan Muslim League (N) MPAs (Punjab)
Punjab MPAs 2018–2023